Wilderness Air, formerly known as Sefofane Air Charter, is an air charter company headquartered in Botswana, Africa.

History

The company was founded in 1991 as Sefofane Air Charter by Neil Lumsden and Suzy Lumsden operating one Cessna 206.

The company operates in Botswana, Namibia, South Africa, and Zimbabwe. The airline's main base of operations is in Maun, Botswana.

Fleet
Wilderness operates the following aircraft:

Cessna 206 Stationair
Cessna 208B Grand Caravan
Cessna 210 Centurion
Reims-Cessna F406 Caravan II

Accidents and incidents
The company had a fatal Cessna 210 accident in April 2010. The aircraft apparently broke up in mid air during a flight from Damaraland to Swakopmund, Namibia. The pilot, the sole occupant of the aircraft, was killed.

References

External links

Airlines of Botswana
Tourism in Botswana
Botswana companies